Forever Together (foaled 25 May 2015) is an Irish Thoroughbred racehorse best known for winning the 2018 Epsom Oaks.

Background
Forever Together is a bay mare with a white star and snip bred in Ireland by the entrepreneur Vimal Khosla and his wife Gillian. She was sired by Galileo, who won the Derby, Irish Derby and King George VI and Queen Elizabeth Stakes in 2001 before becoming one of the world's leading stallions. Her dam Green Room an unraced daughter of the Breeders' Cup Turf winner Theatrical and had previously produced both Together Forever and Lord Shanakill, a horse whose wins included the Prix Jean Prat. Green Room's dam Chain Fern was full-sister of the leading racehorse and broodmare Al Bahathri.

As a yearling the filly was consigned to the Goffs Orby sale in September 2016. She was bought for €900,000 by Michael Magnier, acting on behalf of the Coolmore Stud organisation. The filly was sent into training with Aidan O'Brien at Ballydoyle. Like many of the Coolmore racehorses the details of her ownership have changed from race to race: she has sometimes been listed as being owned by Susan Magnier whilst on other occasions she has been described as the property of a partnership involving Magnier, Derrick Smith and Michael Tabor.

Racing career

2017: two-year-old season
Forever Together ran twice as a two-year-old in 2017, being ridden on both occasions by Wayne Lordan. She made her debut in a one-mile maiden race at Naas Racecourse on 4 October in which she started at odds of 10/1. After starting poorly she stayed on well without ever looking likely to win and finished fourth of the ten runners, more than six lengths behind the winner Who's Steph. Eighteen days later at Leopardstown Racecourse she started at 100/30 for a similar event and came home third behind Contingent and Alghabrah after disputing the lead for most of the way.

2018: three-year-old season
For her first appearance as a three-year-old, Forever Together was sent to England and stepped up in class for the Listed Cheshire Oaks (a trial race for the Epsom Oaks) over one and a half miles at Chester Racecourse on 9 May. Ridden by her trainer's son Donnacha O'Brien she started the 11/2 third choice in the betting behind her stablemate Magic Wand and the Ralph Beckett-trained Kinaesthesia. After encountering considerable trouble in running and struggling to obtain a clear run she was eased down in the final strides and finished second, three and a half lengths behind Magic Wand.

The 240th running of the Oaks Stakes, run on soft ground at Epsom Racecourse on 1 June attracted a field of nine fillies with the Prix Marcel Boussac winner Wild Illusion starting the 5/2 favourite. Forever Together, with Donnacha O'Brien again in the saddle went off at odds of 7/1 while the other fancied runners included Magic Wand, Perfect Clarity (Lingfield Oaks Trial), Give and Take (Musidora Stakes) and Bye Bye Baby (Blue Wind Stakes). Bye Bye Baby set the pace with Forever Together settled behind the leaders before turning into the straight in fourth place. After tracking across to the stands-side rail, Forever Together took the lead approaching the final furlong and drew away to win by four and a half lengths from Wild Illusion, with three and a half lengths back to Bye Bye Baby in third.

Pedigree

Forever Together is inbred 3 × 4 to Northern Dancer meaning that this stallion appears in both the third and fourth generations of her pedigree.

References

External links
 Career 1-2-3 Colour Chart – Forever Together

2015 racehorse births
Racehorses bred in Ireland
Racehorses trained in Ireland
Thoroughbred family 9-e
Epsom Oaks winners